Doubling Gap is an unincorporated community in Cumberland County, in the U.S. state of Pennsylvania.

History
The community takes its name from a nearby, unusually-shaped mountain pass. As early as 1820, a mineral spa resort operated at Doubling Gap. A post office at Doubling Gap operated seasonally in the summers from 1919 until 1927.

References

Unincorporated communities in Pennsylvania
Unincorporated communities in Cumberland County, Pennsylvania